Guru is a 1997 Indian Malayalam-language fantasy drama film directed by Rajiv Anchal and written by C. G. Rajendra Babu from a story by Rajeev. Mohanlal plays the lead role, while Suresh Gopi, Madhupal, Sithara, Kaveri, Sreelakshmi, Nedumudi Venu and Sreenivasan appears in supporting roles, and Nassar in a cameo appearance.

The original musical score and songs were composed by Ilaiyaraaja. The score was conducted and performed by the Budapest Symphony Orchestra, Hungary. This was the first time in Indian cinema, the background score of a film was recorded completely outside the country. Guru was selected as India's official entry to the Oscars for the Best Foreign Language Film category, but was not nominated. Guru is the first Malayalam film submitted by India for the Oscars.

Plot

Raghuraman is the son of a local Hindu temple priest in an idyllic village. The people, Hindus and Muslims, live in harmony. When ambitious politicians goons, disguised as Muslims, cause trouble at the local temple, tensions break out between the two communities leading to widespread religious riots. Raghurāman, after his family is killed, joins a Hindu extremist gang to take revenge by attacking a group of Muslims who have taken refuge in a Guru's Ashram (a place where a holy Guru lived and worked). After infiltrating Ashram, he meets Vaidehi who suggests he meditate for a few moments. During meditation, he experiences an altered state of consciousness and perceives being transported into another world.

In this new world, everyone is blind. They believe the sense of sight to be a lie and that is blasphemous to even talk about it. Children are taught from a very young age that sight does not exist. Raghurāman befriends Ramanagan, a man he saves from death. Raghurāman tries to tell them that there is a world of sight and that he can see, but they refuse to believe him and warn him that such talk will get him killed by the king and the elders.

Living with the man, he learns of their daily life and culture. He notices that they have built a world where sight is not required for anything. He observes when a baby is born in the valley, the juice of a special fruit is given to the infant by the midwives immediately. Ramanagan informs Raghuraman this is the fruit of the sacred tree which was given to them by a goddess when the infants of the valley started to die upon being born. Intrigued by this Raghuraman climbs the tree eats the tasty and highly addictive fruit which is called Ilama pazham (Ilama fruit) by the valley people, the seeds of which are extremely poisonous, which is a common delicacy among them. After eating it, he turns blind and helpless. He is captured by the king's soldiers and is ordered to be executed by forcing him to eat the seeds of Ilama pazham, a very rare and cruel punishment.

After the soldiers follow the orders, he is left to die and is surprised when he wakes up hours later having gotten his sight back. He uses his newfound knowledge to spread the truth about their blindness and the cure. He convinces Ramanagan and his family to trust him and eat the seeds and they too gain their eyesight. The news spreads like wildfire and more and more people begin to eat the seeds and follow Raghuraman.

When the king and advisers learn of this, they arrest Raghuraman. The people respond by starting a rebellion. They storm the palace with weapons where Raghuraman begs them not to use violence and that it achieves nothing. At the same time, in the real world, Raghuraman drops his weapon and wakes up. The extremist group begins their assault on the refugees in the Ashram but Raghuraman rushes to save them, irrespective of their religion.

Cast

 Mohanlal as Raghuraman
 Suresh Gopi as King Vijayanta
 Madhupal as Ramanagan
 Kaveri as Princes Syamantaga
 Sithara as Vaidehi
 Sreelakshmi as Sitalakshmi
 Sonia (actress) as Queen, King Vijayanta's Wife
 Charuhasan as Raghuraman's father
 N. F. Varghese as MLA John Kuruvila
 Murali as Sahib Abdullah
 Sreenivasan as Sravanan
 Nedumudi Venu as Teacher
 Captain Raju as Old King (King Vijayanta's father)
 Reena as Old Queen (King Vijayanta's mother)
 Mohan Raj as Senadhipan
 Kochu Preman 
 Chandni Shaju as Princes Syamantaga's Thozhi
 K. B. Ganesh Kumar
 Shankar as Singer (cameo appearance)
 Nassar as The culprit (cameo appearance)

Production
Rajiv Anchal cites his influence for the film to H. G. Wells's short story The Country of the Blind, which tells the story of a man who finds himself in a valley of blind men. Anchal first read the book during his college education. He was awestruck by its story and the description of the valley of the blind. He used the Wellsian theme in the film to picturise the human condition, that of "darkness overpowering the soul". Anchal is a disciple of the spiritual leader Karunakara Guru, founder of Santhigiri Ashram in Pothencode, Thiruvananthapuram. The idea for the film came when he met Guru seven years ago (since the release). The film is based on the Guru and tells the message Guru strives to convey to the materialistic world. The fund for the film was raised by 60 of the disciples in the Santhigiri Ashram, including Anchal. The film was made on a production cost of 30 million.

Soundtrack
The film's soundtrack contains six songs, all composed by Ilaiyaraaja and lyrics by S. Ramesan Nair. The orchestration for the film's original songs and background score were composed and conducted by Ilaiyaraaja and performed by the Budapest Symphony Orchestra, Hungary. The audio cassette of the soundtrack was presented by Mammootty.

Accolades
Guru was selected as India's official entry to the Oscars for the Best Foreign Language Film category for the 70th Academy Awards. Guru was the first Malayalam film submitted by India for the Oscars.

Screen Awards
 Best Actor (Malayalam) – Mohanlal
 Best Cinematography (South) – S. Kumar
 Best Director (Malayalam) – Rajiv Anchal

Kerala State Film Awards
Best Production Designer – T. Muthuraj
Best Makeup Artist – Pattanam Rasheed
Best Costume Designer – S. B. Satheeshan

See also
 List of submissions to the 70th Academy Awards for Best Foreign Language Film
 List of Indian submissions for the Academy Award for Best Foreign Language Film

References

External links 
 

1997 films
1990s Malayalam-language films
Films scored by Ilaiyaraaja
Indian avant-garde and experimental films
1990s avant-garde and experimental films
Films directed by Rajiv Anchal